The Caletieae is a tribe of plants under the family Picrodendraceae. It comprises 4 subtribes and 13 genera.

See also
 Taxonomy of the Picrodendraceae

References

Picrodendraceae
Malpighiales tribes